The Deputy Leader of the Opposition in Queensland is the title of the leader of the largest minority political party or coalition of parties, known as the Opposition, in the Parliament of Queensland. Prior to 1898, opposition to the government of the day was less organised. The Deputy Leader is responsible for assisting the Leader of the Opposition in managing the Opposition and has a role in administering the Legislative Assembly through the Committee of the Legislative Assembly.

Since 15 March 2022, the position is held by Jarrod Bleijie.

List of officeholders 

 Brian Littleproud
 Joan Sheldon
 David Watson
 Bruce Flegg
 Mark McArdle
 Lawrence Springborg
 Tim Nicholls
 Tim Mulherin
 John-Paul Langbroek
 Deb Frecklington
 Tim Mander
 David Janetzki
 Jarrod Bleijie

References

 
Opposition